is a Rinzai temple in Dazaifu, Fukuoka Prefecture, Japan. It was founded by Ganjin in 761.

Together with Tōdai-ji in Nara and Yakushi-ji in Tochigi Prefecture, it was one of Japan's three official ordination halls during the Nara period.

History
Kaidan-in was first built in 761; the present hall dates to the 17th century. Originally part of Kanzeon-ji, it later came to be administered separately.

Treasures
The seated statue of Rushana Buddha (毘盧遮那仏), from the late Heian period, is located in Kaidan-in's worship hall. Rushana is a form of the cosmic Buddha, Dainichi (Vairocana). The deity was introduced in the Nara period. It is important cultural properties designated by the government.

See also
Kanzeon-ji

Buddhist temples in Fukuoka Prefecture
Rinzai school
Buildings and structures in Dazaifu, Fukuoka